Into the Great Beyond is the second studio album by Japanese metalcore band Crystal Lake. It was released on 3 November 2010 through Imperium Recordings. It is the first and also the last album to feature their second and longest serving bassist Yasuyuki Kotaka before he left the band in 2015 due to his illness. It also the last album to feature two founding members of the band, vocalist Kentaro Nishimura and drummer Yusuke Ishihara.

Background and promotion
On 27 May 2010, Crystal Lake released free download demo Endeavor on their MySpace page. Crystal Lake also announced through MySpace, Twitter, Facebook and YouTube a new music video "Twisted Fate" from the album.

The songs "Twisted Fate", "Open Water", "Daylight" and "Into the Great Beyond" were re-recorded in 2020 for the album The Voyages, a collection of re-recorded Kentaro-era songs.

Track listing

Personnel
Crystal Lake
 Kentaro Nishimura – lead vocals
 Yudai Miyamoto – lead guitar
 Shinya Hori – rhythm guitar
 Yasuyuki Kotaka – bass
 Yusuke Ishihara – drums

References

2010 albums
Crystal Lake (band) albums